Baeopelma is a genus of true bugs belonging to the family Psyllidae.

The species of this genus are found in Europe, New Zealand and Northern America.

Species:
 Baeopelma colorata (Löw, 1888) 
 Baeopelma foersteri (Flor, 1861)

References

Psyllidae